Alexandru Petru Bucur (born 24 April 1994) is a Romanian rugby union footballer. He plays as a centre or full-back for professional SuperLiga club CSM Baia Mare.

Club career
Alexandru Bucur started playing rugby in 2009 at 15 years and a half with Romanian youth club Clubul Sportiv Școlar Bârlad and from 2012 he was selected to join another youth club, Clubul Sportiv Școlar 2 Siromex Baia Mare. After one year with Siromex Baia Mare, Alexandru signed on 2nd of July 2013 a contract with SuperLiga side CSM Baia Mare.

International career
In November 2018, he was called for Romania's national team, the Oaks, making his international debut during the 2018 end-of-year rugby union internationals in a test match against Los Teros.

References

External links

1994 births
Living people
Romanian rugby union players
Romania international rugby union players
CSM Știința Baia Mare players
Rugby union centres
Rugby union fullbacks
Sportspeople from Bârlad